Łęgi may refer to the following places:
Łęgi, Lublin Voivodeship (east Poland)
Łęgi, Masovian Voivodeship (east-central Poland)
Łęgi, Opole Voivodeship (south-west Poland)
Łęgi, Police County in West Pomeranian Voivodeship (north-west Poland)
Łęgi, Świdwin County in West Pomeranian Voivodeship (north-west Poland)